Hinduism in Luxembourg is a minority faith. According to ARDA, Luxembourg had 283 (0.05%) Hindus in 2015.

Hindu Forum Luxembourg (HFL)
The HFL was created by 21 members of the Hindu community in Luxembourg from India, Nepal, Mauritius, and Sri Lanka. It is now planning to build a Hindu temple in Luxembourg. The organisation celebrates Hindu festivals such as Krishna Janmashtami, etc.

References

Luxembourg
Luxembourg